Roosevelt Hospital is a historic building located at 1 Roosevelt Drive in the township of Edison in Middlesex County, New Jersey. It was added to the National Register of Historic Places on March 5, 2002, for its significance in health and medicine, in particular the treatment of tuberculosis. It is currently part of the Roosevelt Care Center at Edison.

History and description
Construction of the hospital was started in 1935 and completed in 1937. The red brick building was designed by architect Aylin Pierson with Colonial Revival style and features an octagonal tower on the roof and white terra cotta details in the interior. It was viewed as "an outstanding example of compact, well organized planning" in Architectural Forum.

Roosevelt Park, located next to the hospital, was built as part of the treatment facilities for tuberculosis.

Gallery

References

External links
 

Edison, New Jersey
Hospitals in Middlesex County, New Jersey	
Colonial Revival architecture in New Jersey	
National Register of Historic Places in Middlesex County, New Jersey
New Jersey Register of Historic Places
Buildings and structures completed in 1937
Hospital buildings on the National Register of Historic Places in New Jersey